Lapsana communis, the common nipplewort, is a species of flowering plant in the family Asteraceae. It is native to Europe and southwestern Asia. and widely naturalized in other regions including North America.

Description

The leaves are alternate and spirally arranged; the larger leaves at the base of the flowering stem are often pinnate, with a large oval terminal leaflet and one to four small side leaflets, while smaller leaves higher on the stem are simple oval; all leaves have toothed margins. The flowers are yellow, produced in a capitulum  diameter, the capitula being numerous in loose clusters at the top of the stem. The capitulum is surrounded by a whorl of involucral bracts, the outer ones very small and the inner ones erect, narrow and stiff and all the same length. The eight to fifteen florets are all ligulate and pale yellow, shaped like a tongue with a five-toothed tip. Each has five stamens and a gynoecium composed of two fused carpels. The fruit is a cypsela surrounded by the hardened remains of the involucral bracts. The numerous small seeds are retained in the cypsela until the plant is shaken by the wind or a passing animal. Pappus is absent.

Subspecies
Lapsana communis subsp. adenophora (Boiss.) Rech.f. – Southeast Europe
Lapsana communis subsp. alpina (Boiss. & Balansa) P.D.Sell. – Crimea
Lapsana communis subsp. communis – most of Europe, except the southeast
Lapsana communis subsp. grandiflora (M. Bieb.) P.D.Sell. – Southwest Asia
Lapsana communis subsp. intermedia (M. Bieb.) Hayek. – Southwest Asia, southeast Europe
Lapsana communis subsp. pisidica (Boiss. & Heldr.) Rech.f. – Greece

Distribution and habitat
Away from its native area, Lapsana communis is common throughout the British Isles, naturalised, and sometimes considered an invasive species, in many areas around the world, including Australia, Chile, New Zealand, Greenland, and most of Canada and the United States.

Lapsana communis is found growing in arable fields, woods, hedges, roadsides, wasteland, hedgerows, woodland margins and clear-felled areas in forests.

Cultivation and uses
The young leaves are edible, and can be used in salads or cooked like spinach. Because of its tiny hairs, some might prefer it mixed with other vegetables. The scientific name comes from lapsane, an edible herb described by Marcus Terentius Varro of ancient Rome. The English name 'nipplewort' was coined in the 17th century as an equivalent of papillaris (from Latin papilla, meaning a nipple), the name used by German apothecaries, since the plant was used to treat cracked nipples and ulcerated breasts, especially under the doctrine of signatures on account of the flower buds' resemblance to nipples.

See also
Nanakusa-no-sekku

References

Cichorieae
Medicinal plants
Flora of Europe
Flora of Asia
Leaf vegetables
Plants described in 1753
Taxa named by Carl Linnaeus